Edale railway station serves the rural village of Edale in the Derbyshire Peak District, in England. The station was opened in 1894 on the Midland Railway's Dore and Chinley line, now known as the Hope Valley Line.

Lying below Kinder Scout, the station is about 5 minutes' walk from the centre of the village, where the Pennine Way begins; the Nags Head public house is known as the official starting point.

History

The station had two platforms either side of a double track connected by an underpass, there was a signal box and sidings to both sides of the running lines to the west of the station.

The station was host to two LMS caravans from 1935 to 1939. A camping coach was positioned here by the London Midland Region from 1954 to 1956.

It became an unstaffed halt in 1969. It formerly had wooden buildings and canopies on each side, but these have been demolished and replaced by basic shelters.

Stationmasters

Lewis Wright 1896 - 1922 (formerly station master at Cromford)
Charles Workman 1922 - 1931 (afterwards station master at Bamford)
Ernest L. Denley 1934 - 1936
C.V. Grocott 1936 (afterwards station master at Harringworth)
Harold Brooks 1936 - 1938
D. Walker ca. 1942

Facilities
The station is managed and served primarily by Northern Trains using rolling stock such as the Class 150 Sprinter and Class 195 Civity, with the occasional Class 156 Super Sprinter. East Midlands Railway services are usually run with Class 158 Express Sprinter units. The station has two platforms with no level crossing or footbridge. To change platforms, there is an underpass located next to the road in the village.

Leading on from this, a penalty fare scheme is in operation here and at other Hope Valley stations. Train running information is offered via CIS displays, automated announcements, timetable posters and a customer help point on each platform. Step-free access is available to both platforms via ramps to/from the subway.

Service
The typical off-peak is one train an hour, with some gaps at certain times of the day, to Sheffield and to Manchester Piccadilly via , provided solely by Northern. This also applies on Saturdays and Sundays.  Until 2018, weekday trains only called every second hour for much of the day.

East Midlands Railway provide the first service of the day to Liverpool Lime Street via . The final return working of the day starts from Liverpool Lime Street and continues on to  via . All other services are provided by Northern Trains. A normal weekday service operates on most bank holidays.

References

External links 

Railway stations in Derbyshire
DfT Category F2 stations
Former Midland Railway stations
Railway stations in Great Britain opened in 1894
Railway stations served by East Midlands Railway
Northern franchise railway stations